Babylon 5 Wars (B5W) is a science fiction tabletop miniature wargame produced by the gaming company Agents of Gaming. Play centers on miniature figurines based the TV show Babylon 5. It was nominated in 1999 for the Origins Award for Best Science Fiction or Fantasy Miniatures Rules. The same year, the Babylon 5 Wars miniature of the Babylon 5 station won the Origins Award for Best Vehicle Miniature.

History
Bruce Graw and Robert Glass designed the first edition of Babylon 5 Wars, and Agents of Gaming published it in 1997. The original rules were complex and the ship selection was minimal. The second edition was produced less than one year later including several key rules revisions and clarifications. It was published in April 1999.) Over the lifespan of the game many supplements were released covering new races and ships.

Due to the cancellation of Babylon 5 Agents of Gaming chose not to renew its contract.  Mongoose Publishing picked up the Babylon 5 license and published A Call to Arms from 2004 to 2008.

Canon 
J. Michael Straczynski considers the Babylon 5 Wars material published by Agents of Gaming  to be canon due to close cooperation between the creators of the game and the show.

Babylon 5 Wars, the Game

Overview
Each player assembles a fleet, represented by counters or miniatures, which equal to a set point limit.  A player is generally limited to a single race to choose his ships.  There is also a limit to ship usage based on fighter space, rarity, and year.

The game is broken down into turns.  Each player interacts in a turn at the same time.  A die roll with certain bonuses determines movement order.  Actions such as drift, power usage, electronic warfare, thrust, and fighter operations must be taken every turn.  A turn can be very long and complex.  Some turns can take up to hours depending on fleet sizes.

Historic scenarios can also be played out based on supplements and rules expansions.  A scenario spells out specific fleet compositions for each player along with map geography and objectives.

Models
The cost of a fighting force is relatively cheap compared to other games in the tabletop miniature wargame genre. Agents of Gaming created associated minis for the majority of published ships, but the company had a chronic problem finding a reliable sculptor.  Sometimes throughout the life of the game no miniatures would be released for months at a time. 

All ship models were released in pewter.  Some ships were very large, taking up several base stands on the playing map.

The only current first-hand source for B5W miniatures is the Agents of Gaming Shopify webstore.

Armies/Races/Species

This is a list of playable races (including one-off "Ships of the Month").

Reviews
Backstab #5

References

External links
 Babylon 5 Wars: official game site.
 Agents of Gaming Shopify store
 Board Game Geek page
 B5Wars.net: Formerly hosted by Agents of Gaming, this is a heavily trafficked forums site for the B5Wars game system.
 Planetside: Home of the 'BabCom' and 'The Great Machine' webzines, which include a vast number of new races, ships, and crossovers from other TV shows and games, by Tyrel Lohr.
 Rich Bax's Site: A collection of very in-depth additions to the game, from one of the game supplements' leading developers, Rich Bax.
 B5Wars Vault: A collection of all currently available fan-made ships and background information. Compiled by Kevin Muñoz.

Wargames introduced in the 1990s
Babylon 5
Miniature wargames
Origins Award winners